Colours is the second studio album of the Danish soft rock band Michael Learns to Rock. It was released in October 1993. As of 1995, the album had sold 1.2 million copies worldwide. In Denmark the album sold 40,000 copies. Colours sold more than 300,000 copies in Thailand, becoming the second best-selling album of all time there (behind Michael Jackson's Thriller).

Track listing

References

1993 albums
Michael Learns to Rock albums